Krishna Leela is a 2015 Indian Kannada-language romantic drama written and directed by Shashank, and produced by Ajay Rao, making his debut at production under the Shree Krishna Arts and Creations banner. Besides Rao, the film features Mayuri Kyatari, making her film debut and Rangayana Raghu in pivotal roles. 

Shashank had revealed that the movie was inspired by a true incident that happened in 2010 in Bangalore. The film released on 20 March 2015 to positive reviews by critics. It completed the 100 days run successfully across theatres in Karnataka. This movie was remade in Bengali in 2021 as Miss Call.

Plot 
"Smile" Krishna, a school bus driver, is trying to clear his debts, and is awaiting to get engaged with his girlfriend Sindhu. One day, Krishna meets Leela after she seeks his help to get her phone recharged. They regularly speak over the phone, but have never seen each other. However, Leela’s abusive father "Benki" Mahadev, breaks her cellphone when he sees her talking to Krishna, and also files a complaint against Krishna for kidnapping Leela, but later they find that Leela is actually in her friends' PG, where they bring her to the police station. 

However, Mahadev berates her for spoiling her reputation, and leaves. Later, Inspector Chandrashekhar asks Leela whether she loves Krishna, where she replies in the affirmative, and Chandrashekhar get them hitched at a temple. Krishna becomes upset and turns abusive against Leela, but soon develops feelings towards her. In order to clear Krishna's debt, Leela requests her mother for money, but Mahadev insults her, which makes an enraged Leela to become drunk and insults Mahadev by revealing his abusiveness against her and her mother to the people. 

Meanwhile, Leela's antics at her house gets uploaded on the social media, and Krishna throws her out of the house and files divorce. The next day, Krishna learns about Leela's sacrifices in order to clear his debts and begins to search for her, along with Chandrashekhar and Mahadev. They find her at Nandi Hills, where Mahadev apologizes to Leela for his mistakes. Later, Krishna reunites with Leela and are happily talking to each other.

Cast 

 Ajai Rao as "Smile" Krishna
 Mayuri Kyatari as Leela
 Rangayana Raghu as Inspector Chandrashekar
 Shobaraj
 Dharmendra Urs as "Benki" Mahadev, Leela's father
 Achyuth Kumar as Krishna's father
 Tabla Nani as Lawyer Parameshwar
 Bullet Prakash
 Sadhu Kokila
 Suchendra Prasad
 Mico Nagaraj
 Vijay Chendoor as Bhawa
 Sharada
 Lakshmi Raj
 Shwetha Srinivas
 Anusha
 Chikkahejjaji Mahadev
 Shivakumar Aradhya
 Umesh Thalya
 Auto Nagaraj
 Sindhu Lokanath in a cameo appearance as Sindhu
 Sneha Acharya as Vibha, Leela's friend

Soundtrack

Sridhar V. Sambhram scored the film's background music and composed for its soundtrack, who also wrote the lyrics for the track "Pesal Man". Shashank, Sri Harsha, Shiva Thejasvi and Sai Sarvesh penned lyrics for other tracks. The soundtrack album consisting of six tracks in total featured actors Upendra and Puneeth Rajkumar singing a track each. The track "Muttlilla Murililla" drew flack due to its controversial lyrics.

Awards and nominations

References

External links
 

2015 films
2010s Kannada-language films
Indian romantic drama films
2015 romantic drama films
Kannada films remade in other languages